Laricifomes officinalis, also known as agarikon, eburiko, or the quinine conk, is a wood-decay fungus that causes brown heart rot on conifers native to Europe, Asia, and North America, as well as Morocco. The fungus is in the order Polyporales, as the fruiting bodies grow in large conks on the trunks of trees. Though it is nearly identical to Fomitopsis officinalis, DNA analysis supports L. officinalis as distinct from the genus Fomitopsis, however the names Laricifomes officinalis and Fomitopsis officinalis are generally used interchangeably.

There has been a history of human use of the fungus, from textiles, to ritualistic masks, and medicinal use; the name "quinine conk" is given due to its bitter taste. There is recent scientific evidence of it having potency against several viruses.

Lariciformes officinalis resides predominantly in old-growth forests, growing in Europe, Asia, and North America, as well as Morocco. It commonly prefers various Larix species, however it has been observed on certain species of coniferous trees in genus Pinus and Cedrus, for example.

Morphology 
These distinctive conks can be found growing out the side of or hanging off the branches of the host tree as high as 65 feet off the ground. These conks grow in a columnar or hoof-like shape, sometimes exceeding 2 feet (65 cm) in length and nearly 1.5 feet (40 cm) in girth, and can weigh up to 20 pounds (10 kg). The young fruiting bodies are soft and yellow-white, soon hardening and becoming chalky throughout. As they age, they begin to exhibit red, brown, or gray developments in coloration, cracking cubically with thick white felts visible in larger cracks. The spores are white and ellipsoid shaped, being released through the bottom of the fruit during warmer months. The taste of both conks and felts is bitter and distinct. A single conk usually indicates the complete infection of the tree, which can become a habitat for snag-nesting organsims.

Medicinal use
The species epithet "officinalis" denotes an organism associated with herbalism or medicine; L. officinalis was used by the Ancient Greeks to treat consumption (tuberculosis) according to the writings of Pedanius Dioscorides in 65 AD, and by some indigenous people to treat smallpox. Later on, the conks were collected extensively for production of medicinal quinine, hence the name "quinine conk", which they were thought to contain because of the bitter taste of the powdered conk, however they do not contain quinine, nor do they possess anti-malarial properties. 

Mycologist Paul Stamets has performed numerous investigations of the biological activities of Agarikon; its extracts have demonstrated antiviral activity against a range of viruses in vitro. This activity has been specifically observed against pox family viruses, HSV-1 and HSV-2, Influenza A, Influenza B, and Mycobacterium tuberculosis in vitro.

Other researchers have identified novel chlorinated coumarins in the organism which demonstrated notably low minimum inhibitory concentrations against the Mycobacterium tuberculosis complex.

Conservation
Because wild Agarikon is found mainly in old growth forests, which have been subject to diseases, invasive species, and deforestation, there has been a sharp decline in habitable space for the fungus. Due to major habitat loss, as well as unregulated harvesting, L.officinalis populations are continuously decreasing. While the fungus is particularly difficult to cultivate, there has been some promising research with inoculating larch branches. It is necessary to preserve the forests to prevent the extinction of Agarikon; though there have been suggestions of researching ex situ cultivation for the purpose of preserving the species, few locations actually protect the forests from logging, and there are only conservation laws put in place for the fungus in Germany, Lithuania, Poland and Slovenia.

Ethnomycology
Laricifomes officinalis, referred to “bread of the ghosts” in local languages, was important both medicinally and spiritually to indigenous peoples of the Pacific Northwest Coast of North America, such as the Tlingit, Haida, and Tsimshian. The fruiting bodies were carved into masks, most likely with ritualistic purposes, and frequently marked the graves of tribal shamans. In addition, there is evidence that the mycelium growing in the rotting wood was being processed into textiles within these same peoples, creating a material similar in texture to leather. In other parts of the world, the fruits were used as a sort of panacea, with evidence of its consumption dating back to past 3000 BCE based upon the stomach content analysis of Ötzi the Iceman containing pieces of Agarikon.

References

External links 

 Index Fungorum
 USDA ARS Fungal Database
 Brown Trunk Rot, Trees, insects and diseases of Canada's forests, Natural Resources Canada
 Agarikon, Cornell University Mushroom Blog

Fungi described in 1789
Fungal tree pathogens and diseases
Fomitopsidaceae
Inedible fungi
Medicinal fungi
Fungi of Africa
Fungi of Asia
Fungi of North America
Fungi of Europe
Taxobox binomials not recognized by IUCN